The main invasion of Iraq occurred in 2003.

Other similar titled events are:
Iraq War, following the 2003 invasion
Islamic State invasion of Iraq, an invasion of Iraq in 2014 by the Islamic State (also known as ISIS)
Gulf War, an invasion of Iraq in 1991 by the United States-led coalition following Iraq's invasion of Kuwait in 1990
Qarmatian invasion of Iraq, a raid of Abbasid Iraq by the Qarmatians in 927–928
Siege of Baghdad (1258), a Mongol invasion of Iraq
Anglo-Iraqi War, the British invasion of Iraq during World War II

See also
Iraq War (disambiguation)
Military history of Iraq
List of wars involving Iraq